Avilés is a city in Asturias, Spain.

Avilés may refer to:

 Avilés (surname)
 Avilés (Asturian comarca), one of 8 comarcas of Asturias, Spain
 Avilés (parish), one of six civil parishes in Avilés, Asturias, Spain

See also
Real Avilés Industrial, a Spanish football team
José María Avilés Province, in the western parts of Tarija department